The men's 100 metres event at the 2019 European Games in Minsk took place on 23 June. The winners in this discipline were determined during the qualifications for Dynamic New Athletics.

Results

Wind:
Match 1: +1.2 m/s, Match 2: -0.4 m/s, Match 3: -1.1 m/s, Match 4: -1.4 m/s

References

Men's 100 metres